George Perley may refer to:

George A. Perley (1843–1934), Canadian politician in Legislative Assembly of New Brunswick
George Halsey Perley (1857–1938), American-born Canadian politician and diplomat